GSV may refer to:

 Garrison of Sør-Varanger, a military base of the Norwegian Army
 General Systems Vehicle, a class of fictional artificially intelligent starship in The Culture universe of late Scottish author Iain Banks
 Geological Survey of Victoria, now GeoScience Victoria
 Gilbert–Shannon–Varshamov bound
 Girls Sport Victoria, an Australian high school sporting association
 Google Street View
Gonad specific virus, a sexually transmitted virus specific to the corn earworm moth
 Great saphenous vein